Elangovan is a given name or surname, which may refer to:

E. V. K. S. Elangovan (active 2004–2009), Indian politician
G. Elangovan (active 1971–1977), Indian politician
P.D. Elangovan (active 1999–2004), Indian politician
T. K. S. Elangovan (born 1954), Indian politician

Hindu given names
Indian masculine given names
Tamil masculine given names